Mongstad Power Station is a natural gas-fired combined power plant and heating plant located at the industrial site of Mongstad in Norway.

The station is owned by a consortium of Equinor (formerly Statoil) and Ørsted A/S, and was operated by the latter, but in 2013 Ørsted divested their share, selling it to Statoil. Construction costs are estimated at NOK 4 billion.
The power station will have an installed effect of 280 MW in electricity production and 350 MW in heat. The energy will be used to operate the Mongstad Refinery as well to supply the Troll Gas Field with power. The plant will use 0.7 billion normal cubic meter (BCM) of gas per year. Emissions of carbon dioxide will be 1.2 million tonnes.

The power station has been subject to controversy in Norway, based upon the potential increase in emission of greenhouse gases. Statoil has entered into an implementation agreement in cooperation with Gassnova which representing the Norwegian government in matters relating to Carbon capture and storage, to develop solutions for carbon dioxide capture at Mongstad. Early in 2009, Statoil delivered a master plan for full-scale CO2 capture at Mongstad.

The closure of the plant has been postponed several times. The plant was supposed to be closed at the end of 2018, but was still in operation as of 2021.

References

Related Reading
CCS projects in Norway by Bjørn-Erik Haugan 

Natural gas-fired power stations in Norway
Equinor
Ørsted (company)